The Battle of Iznalloz, was a battle of the Spanish Reconquista fought in the Province of Granada near the city of Iznalloz, north of the city of Granada in 1295. The battle pitted the troops of the Emirate of Granada, commanded by Muhammad II the Sultan of Granada against those of the Kingdom of Castile who were commanded by the Grand Master of the Order of Calatrava, Ruy Pérez Ponce de León on behalf of Sancho IV of Castile. The battle resulted in a catastrophic defeat for Castile and the Order of Calatrava, whose Grand Master died of wounds suffered in the battle.

Historical context 
With the Marinid surrender of Algeciras and Ronda to the Kingdom of Granada, Granada was able to pursue policies of territorial expansion safe in the knowledge that James II of Aragon would not be adverse to any action by Granada against the Kingdom of Castile as the two kingdoms were themselves at odds.

Battle
In a bid to secure his northern frontier, Muhammad II seized a hill fort at Quesada and routed the forces of the Castilian crown under Ruy Pérez Ponce de León at Iznalloz in the final months of 1295. The Castilian army retired to its camp where Ponce de Leon, the contemporary Grand Master of the Order of Calatrava would die of wounds inflicted in the action.

Aftermath 
The victory of Muhammad II over the Castilian forces facilitated way for an eventual pact of friendship between the Kingdom of Granada and the Kingdom of Aragon which had its own problems with Castile.

See also 
 Ruy Pérez Ponce de León
 Muhammad II of Granada
 Sancho IV of Castile
 Order of Calatrava

References

External links

Bibliography 
 
 
 

Iznalloz
Iznalloz
Iznalloz
13th century in Al-Andalus
Iznalloz
1295 in Europe
13th century in Castile